Allium forrestii is a species of onion native to the Chinese provinces of Sichuan, Tibet and Yunnan. It grows on mountain meadows and slopes at elevations of 2700–4200 m.

Allium forrestii produces a clump of bulbs, each rarely more than 7 mm across. Scapes are purple, up to 30 cm tall, round in cross-section. Leaves are narrow and linear. Umbels are small, with only a few flowers. Flowers are deep purple.

References

forrestii
Onions
Flora of China
Plants described in 1912